Alchornea triplinervia is a commercial timber tree  native to Amazon Rainforest, Atlantic Forest, and Cerrado vegetation in Brazil. This plant is found in the following states of Brazil: Amazonas, Bahia, Espírito Santo, Goiás, Mato Grosso, Mato Grosso do Sul, Minas Gerais, Paraná, Rio de Janeiro, Rio Grande do Sul, Rondônia, Roraima, Santa Catarina, and São Paulo.  It is also used as a honey plant.

See also
List of honey plants 
List of plants of Amazon Rainforest vegetation of Brazil
List of plants of Atlantic Forest vegetation of Brazil
List of plants of Cerrado vegetation of Brazil

References

Alchorneae
Endemic flora of Brazil
Flora of the Amazon
Flora of the Atlantic Forest
Flora of the Cerrado
Trees of Brazil
Trees of Peru